The Dongfeng diesel multiple unit, also known as the Dongfeng motor coach,<ref group="Note" name="">Motor coach was a direct translation from the Russian words Моторвагонный поезд''', which defines a train where some carriages have motors, analogous to the more modern word multiple unit.</ref> and NM1''', was a DMU of Ministry of Railways, and was also the first diesel-hydraulic power car and double deck passenger car of China, built by Qingdao Sifang in 1958. The train consisted two motors and four double deck trailers, and was designed for short, commuter services. Each motor has two DV12A high speed diesel engines, and has the SF2006-1 hydraulic transmission. As the set had numerous flaws, it never entered mass production, but the valuable experience gained in the design and manufacturing process was later applied to the DFH1 and Red Star-class locomotive, while the passenger cars designs were later further developed for double deck trains such as the NZJ.

Development history

Background 
In the 1950s, China started swapping steam power on the railways for diesel power. As a result, in August 1956, the China Academy of Railway Sciences developed the first roadmap for technological development of the railways, creating the "1956 to 1967 Railway Technological development plan", which was heavily discussed at the national level, where it was pointed out that the overall development of technology was dependent on developing new traction motors, and thus a need to replace steam locomotives with electric locomotives and diesel locomotives appeared. This determined the direction that the railways would take in the upcoming years. From 1956 to 1958, the First Machine Industry ministry locomotive research bureau, the Ministry of Railways railway development academy undertook research, and developed personnel and taught the operating principles of diesel locomotives, and their design, completing the groundwork for the future development of diesel locomotives.

In constructing these diesel-electric locomotives, except for the Julong which used the design of the Soviet TE3 locomotive, the other designs all faced difficulties with the transmission. As at the time, China was still rather backwards in building powerful electrical generators, a generator that matched or was close to the output of the diesel motor was not available, so the Jianshe and Xianxing both relied on a reduction gearbox. While Qingdao Sifang also ran into this issue, they opted to take a chance, as hydraulic and electric transmission were simultaneously promoted, and decided to  experiment with hydraulic transmission.

In June 1958, Sifang along with Dalian Locomotive Research Institute, Jiao Tong University and Jining railway sector proceeded to develop the Dongfeng double deck, hydraulic transmission motor coach. Design work for the set and the hydraulic transmission was completed on 18 July 1958. In 22 September, with a build time of just two months, Sifang rolled out the first set of the Dongfeng motor coach. The Dongfeng motor coach was also known as the NM1 motor coach, where "N", "M" stands for internal combustion and motor respectively.

Operational history 
By the end of September 1958, the Dongfeng was delivered to Beijing, for the ninth national railroad worker's exhibition. Due to the lack of experience with hydraulic transmission, there were multiple problems with the structure and properties of the transmission. The hydraulic torque converter was built according to Soviet formulas, which turned out to be inappropriate. In operation, various faults occurred, such as high oil temperatures, out of synchronisation valves, twisted universal joints and so on. In 1961, the two motor cars were removed from service, while the trailers continued in use with Beijing railway sector. In September 1962, the double deck trailers were transferred to Shenyang bureau, Shenyang sector, and became part of a locomotive hauled train.

In March 1963, under the direction of the ministry, the motorcoach returned to Sifang for modifications. These were completed in December 1963, and was assigned to Shanghai bureau, Hangzhou sector. From 5 January 1964, it started on the Shanghai-Hangzhou railway for tests, and started formally carrying passengers from 1 April 1964, running the 93/94 from Shanghai North station to Hangzhou station. From 1978, it was put to use on the Zhegan railway, now part of the Shanghai–Kunming railway, running the 221/222 from Hangzhou—Jinhua—Quzhou. The set underwent further modifications locally with Hangzhou sector from July to September 1969, removing the vertical supports on the upper and lower passenger decks, and replacing the original hopper windows with sliding windows. In 1974, the set returned to Sifang for some modifications, replacing the seats with the same as those on the Type 22 carriage, replacing the sliding bearing on the bogies with roller bearings, and removed the piping for under-car heating.

As the first generation of double deck passenger carriages in China, the design of the set lacked prior experience, and so the operation of these sets revealed multiple problems, such as poor ventilation leading to high temperatures in summer, water leaks reducing the resistance of electrical components, and the corrosion of the structural frame. As a result of these problems, on 16 June 1982, the Dongfeng was withdrawn, and subsequently scrapped.

Design

Power car

Overall layout 

The Dongfeng was designed for short range, high speed travel. Each set had two power cars on either end and trailers in the middle. The two motor cars have the same structure, and were numbered NM1-001 and NM1-002 with the ability for the train to be controlled from either end. They had the same height and width as the passenger cars. Each car was supported by two 2-axle bogies, with the leading axle of motor cars being powered, while the second bogie was trailed in a B-2 layout. From front to rear, the motor car had the driver's cabin, the motor room, the cooling equipment, store rooms and the buffet area. Motor car NM1-001 also had a 10 kW auxiliary petrol engine acting as a generator, providing power to the entire train. The bogie is of a fully welded design, supporting the car through four springs. The bogie was innovative for having vertical hydraulic shock absorber.

Motor equipment 
Each motor car has two Shanxi diesel motor factory built DV12A diesel engines. As such, each motor car has an output of 440 kW (600 hp) and the whole set has an output of 880 kW (1200 hp). Cooling fans are driven directly by the motor, after it passes through a gearbox, friction clutch and a universal joint.

Double deck trailer

Carriage structure 

The four trailers of the Dongfeng DMU were all double deck passenger cars, with the design name of 双2, numbered SK 0001–0004. A feature of these passenger cars was that both the upper and lower decks had 16 support poles, carrying the weight of the upper deck but also adding strength to the car body. However, this design reduced space in the carriage, and made it difficult for passengers with luggage to move around easily. When the car passed a renovation in 1969 with Hangzhou sector, all of the support poles were removed, while the staircase structure was strengthened, while the lower deck was fitted with an arch roof to support the weight of the upper deck. All later designs in China uses an arch structure to support the upper deck instead.

Layout 
The passenger car was separated into the upper and lower decks, and the vestibule at either end of the carriage. As the set was designed with short distance commuting in mind, the carriages were all fitted with 'hard' seats, optimising the carriage for capacity instead of comfort. The lower deck had a rated occupancy of 80 people, the upper deck 104 and vestibules 14 for a total of 198 people per carriage. The vestibules are fitted with toilets, boilers and conductor's seat. The doors of the carriages are located at where the structure of the upper and lower decks meets the unified vestibule structure.

The upper deck used downwards folding windows, while the lower deck used upwards folding windows. While the upper deck originally had slanted windows to allow sunlight in, thermal radiation caused the cabin to heat up uncomfortably, such that in 1966 the windows were removed and welded. The upper deck was originally fitted with 18 roof mounted ventilators, while the lower deck was ventilated by holes on the lower part of the carriage, which then passed air into the carriage. Heating was carried out by boiler heated water circulated in the car. These cars were fitted with the Sifang factory type 202C bogie, with an axle width of  fitted with hydraulic shock absorbers.

See also 

 DFH1
 NZJ

References

Notes 

Diesel multiple units with locomotive-like power cars
CRRC Qingdao Sifang locomotives
Diesel-hydraulic locomotives
B-2 locomotives
CRRC multiple units
Diesel multiple units of China